The Unbearable Being of Lightness is a 45-minute documentary film made in 2016 and directed by Ramchandra PN. The documentary documents a workshop that the filmmaker had conducted for a group of students at the University of Hyderabad, immediately after the student protests on the issue of the suicide of Rohith Vemula had ended at the university.

Plot
The film maker sets off to Hyderabad after student boycott of classes has ended at the University of Hyderabad. As a part of a documentary film-making workshop, the participants have to visit, observe, write and film at a crowded place within the campus called Shopcom, where students hang around after classes. It is also the center of the protests on the Rohith Vemula issue. As the participants read out what they have observed, they can't but bring out the issue of their deceased colleague and the sadness and bitterness associated with it. A group of singers at Shopcom sing a protest song that was written in a different context by Faiz Ahmad Faiz, an actor in Mangalore, Saumesh Bangera, reads out the last letter of Rohith Vemula, his suicide note. and on blank screen, portions of the article written by journalist Sudipto Mondal named 'Rohith Vemula, an unfinished portrait' are read out.

Production
When Rohith Vemula hanged himself in a hostel room on 17 January 2016, the immediate cause and the events leading up to the death came into sharp focus and got nationwide attention. This documentary film seeks to supplement this aspect.  Ramchandra decided not to use video recorded by the students during the workshop or amateur footage shot by protesters, to avoid producing a workshop film or a protest film, and instead to strike a reflective tone, representing various points of view.

Release and screenings 
The film was premiered on 12 November 2016 at the Kolkata International Film Festival.
The film was the official selection in competition section in the Long Documentary category at the 10th International Documentary and Short Film Festival of Kerala.

Reception
The film looks at the three generations of the Vemula family and deals with how over the centuries we have been looking at the issue of Dalits.

The Hindu in its Sunday edition has describes the film as uncomfortable.
"Against this peaceful, even nonchalant, setting are visible the faint silhouette of a face and a dark crop of unruly hair as we hear Vemula’s last words. This juxtaposition is deliberately uncomfortable. It makes the reality of what is being read out and the general sense of indifference and injustice hang even heavier. Odd angles and the frequent use of a black screen add to this jarring visual experience, an instance of form mirroring content."(Source: The Hindu)

The New Minute too describes the film on similar lines.
"The 45 minute documentary captures protests too, but as an observer and not participant. The uncomfortable camera angles and shaky focus are deliberate - this is not a film you're meant to sit back and watch."(Source: The News Minute)

Certificate of exemption at IDSFFK 
The Unbearable Being of Lightness along with two other films, March March March, directed by Kathu Lukose and In the Shade of Fallen Chinar, directed by N.C. Fazil and Shawn Sebastian, was denied an exemption from certification from the Information and Broadcasting Ministry, Government of India  at the 10th International Documentary and Short Film Festival of Kerala (IDSFFK) that was held 16–20 June 2017 for the subjects that they had chosen and thus were denied screenings. There were widespread protests and parallel screenings held in various places. The government of Kerala registered a case at the Kerala High Court against the order.

The court squashed the exemption order with regards to The Unbearable Being of Lightness stating that it was illegal, in November 2017.  Subsequently, the Kerala State Chalachitra Academy, the organizers of IDSFFK, screened the film at the other film Festival they conduct, the International Film Festival of Kerala at Kochi in March 2018.

References

External links

Films set in Hyderabad, India
Indian documentary films
2016 documentary films
Documentary films about suicide
2016 films
2010s English-language films
English-language Indian films